Shahrak-e Afshariyeh (also Romanized as Shahrak-e Afshārīyeh) is a village in Ramjin Rural District, Chaharbagh District, Savojbolagh County, Alborz Province, Iran. At the 2006 census, its population was 261, in 63 families.

References 

Populated places in Savojbolagh County